is a passenger railway station located in the city of Ōzu, Ehime Prefecture, Japan. It is operated by JR Shikoku and has the station number "S15".

Lines
Only local trains stop at the station. Connections with other services are needed to travel further east of Matsuyama on the line.

Layout
The station consists of a side platform serving a single track. The station building is unstaffed and serves only as a waiting room.

History
The station opened on 14 February 1918. At that time, it was an intermediate station on the privately run 762 mm gauge Ehime Railway from Nagahama-machi (now ) to Ōzu (now ). When the company was nationalized on 1 October 1933, Japanese Government Railways (JGR) assumed control and operated the station as part of the Ehime Line. Subsequently, the track of the Ehime Line was regauged to 1,067 mm. The stretch of Ehime Line track from Iyo-Nagahama to Iyo-Ōzu, including Hataki was then incorporated into the Yosan Main Line on 6 October 1935. In the process, Hataki was also moved to its present location. With the privatization of JNR on 1 April 1987, the station came under the control of JR Shikoku.

Surrounding area
Ozu Municipal Awazu Elementary School
Ozu Municipal Ozu Higashi Junior High School

See also
 List of railway stations in Japan

References

External links
Station timetable

Railway stations in Ehime Prefecture
Railway stations in Japan opened in 1918
Ōzu, Ehime